Auzeville-Tolosane is a commune in the Haute-Garonne department in the Occitanie region in southwestern France.

Population
The inhabitants are called Auzevillois.

International relations
It is twinned with :
 Broughton, Wales
 Călugăreni, Romania

See also
Communes of the Haute-Garonne department

References

Communes of Haute-Garonne